The 1950 Alabama Crimson Tide football team (variously "Alabama", "UA" or "Bama") represented the University of Alabama in the 1950 college football season. It was the Crimson Tide's 56th overall and 17th season as a member of the Southeastern Conference (SEC). The team was led by head coach Harold Drew, in his fourth year, and played their home games at Denny Stadium in Tuscaloosa, Legion Field in Birmingham and Ladd Stadium in Mobile, Alabama. They finished with a record of nine wins and two losses (9–2 overall, 6–2 in the SEC).

Alabama ten went on to win their final six games over Mississippi State, Georgia, Georgia Tech, Florida and Auburn. Although they finished ranked in the top 20 of both major polls, the Crimson Tide did not receive a bid to play in a bowl game at the conclusion of the season.

Schedule

Game summaries

Chattanooga

Source:

To open the 1950 season, Alabama shutout the Chattanooga Moccasins 27–0 at Legion Field. After a scoreless first quarter, Alabama recovered a Mocs fumble at their 14-yard line early in the second. On the next play, Ed Salem scored on a 14-yard run for a 7–0 Crimson Tide lead. Alabama then extended their lead to 14–0 by halftime when Salem connected with Larry Chiodetti on a 25-yard touchdown reception. In the third, Salem threw his second touchdown pass of the game to Al Lary from 53-yards out for a 20–0 lead. Bobby Wilson then closed the scoring late in the fourth quarter with his one-yard touchdown run to make the final score 27–0. The victory improved Alabama's all-time record against Chattanooga to 5–0.

Tulane

Source:

To open conference play for the 1950 season, Alabama traveled to New Orleans and defeated Tulane 26–14 to end a three-game losing streak against the Green Wave. After a six-yard Ed Salem touchdown run gave Alabama a 6–0 lead in the first quarter, Al Lary was responsible for the final three Crimson Tide touchdown receptions. After a 26-yard reception from Salem in the second, Lary had touchdown receptions of six-yards from Butch Avinger and 41-yards from Salem in the third to give Alabama a 26–0 lead. Tulane responded with a pair of touchdowns on runs of five-yards by George Kinek and seven-yards by Alvis Batson to make the final score 26–14. The win improved Alabama's all-time record against Tulane to 16–7–1.

Vanderbilt

Source:

At Ladd Stadium, the Crimson Tide lost their first game of the season by a final score of 27–22 to the Vanderbilt Commodores. Vandy took a 14–0 first quarter lead on a pair of Bill Wade touchdown passes. The first was an 85-yard pass to Ernest Curtis and the second a 15-yard pass to Sylbert Cook. The Crimson Tide responded with a 15-yard Ed Salem touchdown run to make the score at the end of the first 14–7. In the second quarter, the Commodores scored on a one-yard Mac Robinson touchdown run and Alabama scored on a 17-yard Butch Avinger touchdown pass to Al Lary to make the halftime score 21–13 in favor of Vanderbilt. The Commodores scored their final points on a 21-yard Wade pass to Curtis in the third before the Crimson Tide scored nine fourth quarter points to make the final score 27–22. The loss brought Alabama's all-time record against Vanderbilt to 16–13–1.

Furman

Source:

In what was the first Denny Stadium game of the 1946 season, Alabama defeated the Furman Purple Hurricane 34–6 before a crowd of 12,000 on a Friday night. After a scoreless first quarter, the Crimson Tide took a 14–0 halftime lead after touchdown runs of 52-yards by Butch Avinger and 21-yards by Ed Salem in the second quarter. After Alabama extended their lead to 21–0 on a four-yard Salem run, Furman scored their only points of the game on a three-yard Tommy Williams run to make the score at the end of the third quarter 21–6. The Crimson Tide then closed the game with a pair of fourth-quarter touchdowns first on a seven-yard Jim Burkett run and then on a 42-yard Clell Hobson pass to Al Lary to make the final score 34–6. The victory improved Alabama's all-time record against Furman to 3–0.

Tennessee

Sources:

Alabama lost 14–9 to the rival Tennessee Volunteers before 50,000 fans at Shields-Watkins Field in Knoxville. Harold Lutz gave the Crimson Tide a 3–0 first quarter lead with his 20-yard field goal, Alabama's first of the season. Tennessee responded with a two-yard Andy Kozar touchdown run in the second quarter to give the Vols a 7–3 halftime lead. After a 43-yard Bobby Marlow touchdown run in the third gave Alabama a 9–7 lead, Kozar scored the game-winning touchdown on a fourth-and-one play, from the Alabama one-yard line, with less than one minute remaining in the game for the 14–9 Tennessee victory. The loss brought Alabama's all-time record against Tennessee to 17–11–4.

Mississippi State

Source:

On homecoming in Tuscaloosa, the Crimson Tide defeated the Mississippi State Maroons 14–7 before the largest crowd to attend a game at Denny Stadium to date. As the teams entered the fourth quarter, the score remained scoreless. In the fourth, Alabama took a 14–0 lead on touchdown runs of three-yards by Jim Burkett and of 53-yards by James Melton. The Maroons then answered with their only touchdown of the game on a 20-yard Gil Verderver pass to Max Stainbrook and made the final score 14–7. The victory improved Alabama's all-time record against Mississippi State to 26–7–2.

Georgia

Sources:

In Birmingham, Alabama defeated the Georgia Bulldogs 14–7 in cold and rainy conditions at Legion Field. After a scoreless first quarter, Georgia took a 7–0 halftime lead when Lewis Brunson scored on a one-yard touchdown run. The Crimson Tide responded with a pair of second half touchdowns and won the game 14–7. Butch Avinger scored on a one-yard run in the third and Tom Calvin scored on a one-yard run in the fourth quarter. For the game, Ed Salem passed for 193 yards on 12 completions in the win. The victory improved Alabama's all-time record against Georgia to 18–15–3.

Mississippi Southern

Source:

Against the Mississippi Southern Southerners the Crimson Tide won in a 53–0 shutout at Denny Stadium. After a scoreless first quarter for the third consecutive week, Alabama took a 21–0 halftime lead on three Al Lary touchdown receptions. The first two were thrown by Ed Salem from 10 and 51-yards with the third thrown by James Melton from 21-yards. The Crimson Tide aerial attack continued into the third quarter with another three passing touchdowns, in addition to one on an interception return, to make the score 47–0 by the fourth quarter. The first was thrown 13-yards from Butch Avinger to Ed Lary; the second was thrown from three-yards from Clell Hobson to George McCain; the third was thrown nine-yards from McCain to Ed Lary; and the fourth was scored when O. E. Phillips had a 29-yard interception return. The final points were then scored in the fourth quarter on a 10-yard McCain pass to Joe Curtis to make the final score 53–0. For the game, the Alabama quarterbacks collectively completed 21 of 26 passes for 283 yards. The victory improved Alabama's all-time record against Mississippi Southern to 4–0.

Georgia Tech

Source:

After Alabama scored 27 first quarter points, the Crimson Tide went on to defeat the Georgia Tech Yellow Jackets 54–19 at Grant Field in Atlanta. Bobby Marlow scored Alabama's first three touchdowns on a two-yard run, a 24-yard reception from Ed Salem and on a 91-yard run. Tom Calvin then scored the final touchdown of the quarter to give the Crimson Tide a 27–0 lead at the end of the first quarter. In the second quarter, Marlow scored his fourth touchdown of the game on a 24-yard pass from Salem, and then Tech scored their first points on a 36-yard Robert North touchdown run to make the halftime score 34–6. After George McCain scored on a two-yard run in the third, each team closed the game in the fourth quarter with a pair of touchdowns. For the Crimson Tide, Dick Barry scored on a one-yard run and on a Salem touchdown pass. The Yellow Jackets scored on a 10-yard Joe Salome pass to Henry Ferris and on a one-yard James Patton run to make the final score 54–19. The victory improved Alabama's all-time record against Georgia Tech to 17–12–3.

Florida

Source:

For the second year in a row in what was their final road game of the season, Alabama defeated the Florida Gators 41–13 in their first all-time trip to the Gator Bowl in Jacksonville. After Bobby Marlow scored on a one-yard run in the first, Ed Salem scored three second-quarter touchdowns on runs of six, eight and five-yards to give the Crimson Tide a 27–0 halftime lead. After Alabama extended their lead to 29–0 with a third quarter safety, each team scored a pair of fourth-quarter touchdowns to make the final score 41–13. The Crimson Tide scored on a one-yard Butch Avinger run and on a five-yard Larry Chiodetti run; the Gators scored on a one-yard William McGowan run and on a 70-yard Haywood Sullivan pass to Dan Howell. The victory improved Alabama's all-time record against Florida to 8–3.

Auburn

Source:

A year after they were upset by Auburn 14–13, Alabama scored touchdowns in all four quarters and shutout the Tigers 34–0 at Legion Field. Bobby Marlow scored the first three touchdowns for the Crimson Tide on a 26-yard reception from Ed Salem in the first, and on runs of seven and two yards in the second and third quarters. A 31-yard Larry Chiodetti run in the third and one-yard Jim Burkett run in the fourth quarter provided the final 34–0 margin. The victory improved Alabama's all-time record against Auburn to 6–8–1.

Personnel

Varsity letter winners

Coaching staff

References
General

 

Specific

Alabama
Alabama Crimson Tide football seasons
Alabama Crimson Tide football